The 2007 Total Spa 24 Hours was the 60th running of the Spa 24 Hours as well as the fifth round of the 2007 FIA GT Championship season, was sponsored by Total S.A.  The G3 class also included cars running in the GT3 specification seen in the FIA GT3 European Championship, although this event was not part of their scheduled season.  It took place at Circuit de Spa-Francorchamps, Belgium, on July 28 and 29 2007.

Report
The race was run under varying weather conditions over the 24-hour period, with occasional heavy rain leading to length safety car periods several times.  The #33 Jetalliance Aston Martin led the race early on, yet was forced to drop out after 158 laps.  The lead was then shared by a group of cars all running on the same lap, including both Vitaphone Racing Maseratis as well as the Scuderia Playteam Maserati, as well as the PK Carsport and Carsport Holland Corvettes.

Nearing the final hour of the race, the #1 Vitaphone Racing Maserati had a lap lead over Carsport Holland, but a mistake on a slippery track led to the car becoming buried in a gravel trap.  While the car was being extracted, the Carsport Holland Corvette would take over the lead, remaining there to take the victory.  The margin of victory was 1:17.756.

In GT2, the BMS Scuderia Italia Porsche lead for nearly the entire event, eventually earning a four lap margin of victory.  In the G2 class, the pair of Mosler MT900s would easily defeat other competitors, with the Belgian G&A Racing team taking the class win.  Fellow Belgian team Mühlner Motorsport would take the G3 class victory, with their Porsche 997 GT3 Cup 16 laps ahead of the nearest competitor.  In the Coupe du Roi relay, the JMB Racing Ferrari would be the only car to finish the event, earning them the win.

Half-point Leaders
In the FIA GT Championship (using the GT1 and GT2 classes), the top eight teams are awarded half-points for their position both at the six-hour mark as well as at the midway point of the race.  Points for the top eight go in the order of 5 – 4 – 3 – 2.5 – 2 – 1.5 – 1 – 0.5.

6 Hour Leaders in GT1

6 Hour Leaders in GT2

12 Hour Leaders in GT1

12 Hour Leaders in GT2

Official results
Class winners in bold.  Cars failing to complete 75% of winner's distance marked as Not Classified (NC).

Statistics
 Pole Position – #5 Carsport Holland – 2:14.554
 Average Speed – 155.21 km/h

External links
 Official FIA GT website – Race Results
 Total 24 Hours – Official website

Spa
Spa
Spa 24 Hours